Scotts Corner is an unincorporated community in Twin Lakes Township, Carlton County, Minnesota, United States; located near Wrenshall and Chub Lake.

The community is located three miles southwest of Wrenshall at the intersection of Carlton County Roads 3 and 4.

Further reading
 Official State of Minnesota Highway Map – 2011/2012 edition
 Mn/DOT map of Carlton County – 2012 edition

Unincorporated communities in Carlton County, Minnesota
Unincorporated communities in Minnesota